HCQ is hydroxychloroquine, a medication for malaria, rheumatoid arthritis, lupus and porphyria cutanea tarda.

HCQ may also refer to:

 Halls Creek Airport (IATA code), Australia
 Huizhou railway station (telegram code), China